An Ōban (大判) was a monetary ovoid gold plate, and the largest denomination of Tokugawa coinage. Tokugawa coinage worked according to a triple monetary standard, using gold, silver and bronze coins, each with their own denominations. 

The first Oban – Tenshō Ōban (天正大判) – were minted by the Gotō family under the orders of Hideyoshi in 1588.

The Tenshō Ōban was equivalent to ten Ryōs, or ten Koban (小判) plates, with a weight of 165 g.

Notes

References

Coins of Japan
Gold coins
Modern obsolete currencies
Edo period